William Parker Cutler (July 12, 1812 – April 11, 1889) was an American railroad executive and politician who served as a U.S. Representative from Ohio for one term from 1861 to 1863.

Early life and education 
William Cutler, the youngest son of Ephraim Cutler and Sally Parker Cutler, and grandson of Manasseh Cutler, was born July 12, 1812, at the Cutler homestead in Warren Township, Washington County, Ohio. In 1829, he entered Ohio University at Athens. Ill-health forced him to drop out after his junior year. He farmed with his father, and continued ill health for several years prevented any professional aspirations.

Political career 
In 1840, he campaigned for Whig nominee William Henry Harrison, and was nominated for the Ohio House of Representatives in 1842, but lost to George M. Woodbridge. In 1844, in his second try, he was elected by a large majority to the House. He was re-elected in 1845. In 1846, he was elected again, and was chosen by the Whig caucus as Speaker of the House.

After the close of the 1846-1847 session, Cutler's colleague, Hon. E. G. Squier wrote to a Cincinnati newspaper:

In 1848, Cutler received support for Governor of Ohio, but the Whigs decided on a Northern Ohio candidate, and chose Seabury Ford, who ended up winning election.

Cutler was a trustee of Ohio University 1849–1853.

Cutler was married in 1849 to Elizabeth W. Voris of Warren Township, Washington County, Ohio. She, along with one daughter survived him. Three sons and two daughters died in early childhood.

First run for Congress 
Later that year, he was nominated for congressman from the  district, composed of Washington, Morgan and Perry Counties. He lost to Democrat William A. Whittlesey.

In 1849, Cutler was elected to represent Washington County at the constitutional convention that re-wrote the constitution in 1850. While at the convention in Columbus, Ohio, the Whig State Convention was held May 6 and 7, 1850. Several members encouraged Cutler to be candidate for Governor. He declined, and William Johnston was nominated and lost the general election.

Railroad career
In the Legislature in 1845, Cutler procured a charter for the Belpre and Cincinnati Railroad. He was elected a director of the company at its organization in August 1847. He travelled to Baltimore in 1849 to persuade the Baltimore and Ohio Railroad (B&O) to connect to their line. The B&O decided on a different route.

At the meeting of the Belpre and Cincinnati in August 1850, Cutler was chosen president. Surveys began at once, and construction began in 1851. Large investment from the Pennsylvania Railroad and the city of Wheeling were made contingent on a change of name of the company. On August 12, 1851, the board voted to change the name to the Marietta and Cincinnati Railroad. A line to Wheeling was planned for completion by December 1, 1854. Up to 6000 men worked at construction, and progress continued until the Crimean War broke out, securities sales ceased, and the workmen were laid off. Cutler's health failed, and he resigned as president in September 1854, but continued as a director.

After several delays, a line from Athens to Marietta was opened April 9, 1857, just in time for the economy to collapse in the Panic of 1857. Cutler was elected vice-president in 1857, and president in May 1858. He continued until fall 1859, when the company was able to financially re-organize.

Trustee of Marietta College 1845–1889.

Congress
Cutler was elected as a Republican to the Thirty-seventh Congress (March 4, 1861 – March 3, 1863). He was an unsuccessful candidate for reelection in 1862 to the Thirty-eighth Congress. He resumed agricultural pursuits and also engaged in railroad building.

Death 
He died in Marietta, Ohio, April 11, 1889. He was interred in Oak Grove Cemetery.

See also

 United States House of Representatives elections in Ohio, 1860
 United States House of Representatives elections in Ohio, 1862

Notes

References

1812 births
1889 deaths
Speakers of the Ohio House of Representatives
Ohio Whigs
Ohio University alumni
Politicians from Marietta, Ohio
Ohio University trustees
19th-century American railroad executives
Ohio Constitutional Convention (1850)
19th-century American politicians
Members of the Ohio House of Representatives
Republican Party members of the United States House of Representatives from Ohio